Petaloporidae is a family of bryozoans belonging to the order Cyclostomatida.

Genera

Genera:
 Cavarinella Marsson, 1887
 Choristopetalum Lonsdale, 1849
 Coelocochlea von Hagenow, 1851

References

Cyclostomatida